Glen Levit is an unincorporated community in Restigouche County, New Brunswick, Canada.

History 
In 1866, only 18 families resided in the lumber and farming town.  By 1898, two churches and a post office had been erected.

See also
History of New Brunswick
List of communities in New Brunswick
List of people from Restigouche County, New Brunswick

References

Communities in Restigouche County, New Brunswick